Antônio Josenildo Rodrigues de Oliveira (born 10 October 1997), commonly known as Rodrigues, is a Brazilian professional footballer who plays as a central defender for Major League Soccer side San Jose Earthquakes, on loan from Grêmio.

Career
Rodrigues began playing football with the youth academy of ABC in 2013, then Cruzeiro in 2015 before returning to ABC again in 2017. He began playing under the name Tonhão, before switching to Rodrigues to honour his adoptive mother. He made his professional debut with ABC in a 2–0 Campeonato Brasileiro Série B loss to Vila Nova on 26 August 2017. On 9 August 2019, he signed a professional contract with Grêmio after a brief loan with them.

Honours
ABC
Campeonato Potiguar: 2017, 2018

Grêmio
Campeonato Gaúcho: 2019, 2020, 2021, 2022
Recopa Gaúcha: 2019, 2021, 2022

References

External links
 
 Grêmio Profile

1997 births
Living people
Sportspeople from Rio Grande do Norte
Brazilian footballers
Association football defenders
Grêmio Foot-Ball Porto Alegrense players
Major League Soccer players
San Jose Earthquakes players
ABC Futebol Clube players
Campeonato Brasileiro Série A players
Campeonato Brasileiro Série B players
Campeonato Brasileiro Série C players
MLS Next Pro players